Smoke generator may refer to:

 Smoke bomb, used in fireworks or pranks
 Smoke grenade, used for signaling and concealment, especially in military contexts
 Smoke testing (mechanical)
 Theatrical smoke and fog
 A device on a military vehicle which generates a smoke screen

See also
 Smoke testing (disambiguation)